The Qingshui Geothermal Power Plant is an upcoming geothermal power plant in Datong Township, Yilan County, Taiwan.

History
In 2017, the developer of the power plant won the right to use the land where the plant stands today. The construction of the power plant was completed in September 2021 and was approved to be commissioned on 27 October the same year. It was then commissioned on 23 November 2021.

Technical specifications
The power plant has an installed generation capacity of 4.2 MW. It is developed by Fabulous Power Co. The temperature of the geothermal reservoir is around 180°C with a depth of 1,200–2,100 meters. It has an hourly power generation capacity of 3,150 kWh.

Finance
The power plant was constructed with a cost of NT$765 million. Yiyuan, the company that invested into the power plant, was granted the permit to operate the power purchase agreement for 20 years, in which it will pay the government NT$2 million annually.

See also
 Geothermal energy in Taiwan
 List of power stations in Taiwan

References

2021 establishments in Taiwan
Buildings and structures in Yilan County, Taiwan
Energy infrastructure completed in 2021
Geothermal power stations
Renewable energy power stations in Taiwan